Conservative Christianity, also known as conservative theology, theological conservatism, traditional Christianity, or biblical orthodoxy is a grouping of overlapping and denominationally diverse theological movements within Christianity that seeks to retain the orthodox and long-standing traditions and beliefs of Christianity, it is contrasted with Liberal Christianity and Progressive Christianity which are seen as heterodoxies by theological conservatives. Conservative Christianity should not be mistaken as being synonymous with the political philosophy of conservatism nor the Christian right which is a political movement of Christians who support conservative political ideologies and policies within the realm of secular or non-sectarian politics. The two major subdivisions of Conservative Christianity within Protestantism are Evangelical Christianity and Christian Fundamentalism while the Confessing Movement, Confessionalism, and Neo-orthodoxy make up the remaining within Protestantism.  Theological conservatism is also found in Roman Catholicism (excluding Catholic Modernism) and is also found within Eastern Christianity although neither having a direct connection with the Fundamentalist–Modernist controversy.

Evangelical leaders like Tony Perkins of the Family Research Council have called attention to the problem of equating the term Christian right with theological conservatism and Evangelicalism. Although evangelicals constitute the core constituency of the Christian right within the United States, not all evangelicals fit that political description. The problem of describing the Christian right which in most cases is conflated with theological conservatism in secular media, is further complicated by the fact that the label religious conservative or conservative Christian applies to other religious groups who are theologically, socially, and culturally conservative but do not have overtly political organizations associated with some of these Christian denominations, which are usually uninvolved, uninterested, apathetic, or indifferent towards politics. Tim Keller, an Evangelical theologian and Presbyterian Church in America pastor, shows that Conservative Christianity (theology) predates the Christian right (politics), and that being a theological conservative didn't necessitate being a political conservative, that some political progressive views around economics, helping the poor, the redistribution of wealth, and racial diversity are compatible with theologically conservative Christianity. Rod Dreher, a senior editor for The American Conservative, a secular conservative magazine, also argues the same differences, even claiming that a "traditional Christian" a theological conservative, can simultaneously be left on economics (economic progressive) and even a socialist at that while maintaining traditional Christian beliefs.

General beliefs 

 "Higher" view of scripture being the authoritative "Word" of God. A belief in the authority of the Bible as God's revelation to humanity. Bible prophecy and Bible inerrancy are often affirmed, some may take it further and believe in biblical literalism, while other may hold views of biblical infallibility. This often includes the understanding that the Bible in it original manuscripts, is the final authority in all matters on which it speaks or on matters of faith and religion.
 The Virgin birth of Jesus Christ.
 The doctrine of Trinity, i.e., God the Father, God the Son and God the Holy Spirit.
 The doctrine of the deity of Jesus Christ (i.e., that Jesus is fully God and fully man).
 The literal, physical resurrection of Jesus.
 The literal, physical return of Jesus.
 The belief in both a literal Heaven and a literal Hell as biblically described (purgatory may be added in for Catholics although not accepted by others), 
 The doctrine of original sin is held by the Western Christian branch of theological conservatism.
 Among Theological Conservative Christians overall, the resurrection of Christ is seen as the most important actual event in the history of the world. 
 For Theological Conservative Protestant Christians specifically, they place a central focus on Christ's redeeming work on the cross as the only means for salvation and the forgiveness of sins.'
 Theological Conservative Christians take to be true biblical teachings such as Jesus’ statement: "I am the way and the truth and the life. No one comes to the Father except through me" (John 14:6).'

Moreover it went on to address philosophical concerns the presuppositions for the first time arguing beyond the creeds that philosophical positions were vital, "Since the Renaissance, and more particularly since the Enlightenment, world views have been developed that involve skepticism about basic Christian tenets. Such are the agnosticism that denies that God is knowable, the rationalism that denies that He is incomprehensible, the idealism that denies that He is transcendent, and the existentialism that denies rationality in His relationships with us. When these un- and anti-Biblical principles seep into men's theologies at a presuppositional level, as today they frequently do, faithful interpretation of Holy Scripture becomes impossible."

Component movements 
It may specifically refer to movements such as:
Christian fundamentalism, a movement within Protestantism upholding biblical literalism.
Evangelicalism, worldwide interdenominational movement within Protestant Christianity that affirms the centrality of being "born again" in which an individual experiences personal conversion as well as the biblical inerrancy. 
Conservative evangelicalism in the United Kingdom, a theological movement within evangelical Protestant Christianity
The Confessing Movement, an evangelical and/or confessional movement within several mainline Protestant denominations
A few scholars label Catholics who reject Liberal Christianity, Progressive Christianity, and Catholic Modernism in favor of more traditional doctrines as fundamentalists.
Catholics who are faithful to the teachings of the Magisterium (the teaching authority of the Catholic Church) as well as the Scriptures and Traditions of the Church, can be considered theological conservatives in certain respects (if conservative means "according to the central moral and theological teachings historically accepted by the majority of Christendom [Christianity]")
The Traditionalist Catholic movement, Roman Catholics who believe that the Catholic Church has strayed from its doctrine since the Second Vatican Council.
Confessionalism (religion), a belief in the importance of full and unambiguous assent to the whole of a religious teaching
Confessional Lutheranism, a designation for Lutherans or Lutheran groups who believe in the doctrines taught in the Book of Concord of 1580, which is a summary of the teachings found in Scripture, requires attention to how that faith is actually being preached, taught, and put into practice.
Theologically Conservative Christian views on Homosexuality.
Neo-orthodoxy, a theological movement developed in the aftermath of the First World War as a reaction against doctrines of 19th-century liberal theology and a reevaluation of the teachings of the Reformation.

See also 
 Christian fundamentalism
 Moderate Christianity
 Liberal Christianity
 Progressive Christianity
 Conservatism

References

Christian terminology
Christian theological movements